Sir William Colin Mackenzie PRSA FRSE (9 March 1877 – 29 June 1938), usually known as Colin Mackenzie, was an Australian anatomist, benefactor, museum administrator and director. He was best known for creating Healesville Sanctuary.

Early life
Mackenzie was the youngest son of John Mackenzie, a draper, and Anne, née McKay, both of Scottish origin. He was born at Kilmore, Victoria and was educated at the local state school, continuing his education at Scotch College, Melbourne after obtaining a scholarship. He qualified for matriculation with honours in Greek at the end of 1893, and beginning his course at the University of Melbourne soon afterwards, graduated MB, with first class honours in surgery, obstetric medicine and diseases of women and children in 1899. He later took out a BS degree in 1902.

Medical career
Mackenzie had a year's hospital practice at the Royal Melbourne Hospital, for two years was senior resident medical officer at the Royal Children's Hospital, and was in general practice for some time at North Melbourne. In 1904 he paid his first visit to Europe and obtained by examination his fellowship of the Royal College of Surgeons of Edinburgh. At the Children's hospital, Melbourne, he had been much interested in the problem of the after treatment of infantile paralysis, and while in Europe worked with Professor Vulpius at Heidelberg, and studied the work being done by Sir Robert Jones at Liverpool. Coming back to Australia, he found there was then a severe epidemic of infantile paralysis, and was able to use his newly acquired knowledge of the principles of muscle rest and recovery. He was not, however, content to merely follow other men. He felt that the main problem was how to bring the muscles into normal use again, and however commonplace his methods may seem today, at the time, they appeared to be revolutionary. He was the first to Speak of "muscle re-education" and to realise the importance of the action of gravity in attempts to regain muscle function. 

A few years later Sir Arthur Keith in his Menders of the Maimed, (1919), paid a tribute to Mackenzie's work in this direction. "Dr Mackenzie," said, "makes no claim to be the discoverer of the 'minimal load' treatment of disabled muscles, but I am certain that no one has realized its practical importance more than he, and no one has realized and applied the right methods to the restoration of disabled muscles with a greater degree of skill." This recognition, however, came many years later, and during the first decade of this century Mackenzie had to do much research in finding out what could be done. Mackenzie was appointed Caroline Kay scholar and demonstrator in anatomy at the university of Melbourne in 1907 under Professor R. J. A. Berry, and about this time became much interested in the fauna of Australia. He leased land at Badger Creek, near Healesville, Victoria, which subsequently became the Colin Mackenzie sanctuary, and he spent much time on the unravelling of the anatomical details of the koala, the platypus, the wombat, and other Australian animals. Early in 1915 he went to England, did further work in anatomy, and assisted Sir Arthur Keith in the cataloguing of war specimens. In 1917 he organised a muscle re-education department for Sir Robert Jones at the orthopaedic military hospital at Shepherd's Bush, London, and in 1918 published his The Action of Muscles (reprinted in 1919, second ed. 1930). Another book published in 1918 was the seventh edition of Treves's Surgical Applied Anatomy, in the revision of which Mackenzie had collaborated with Sir Arthur Keith.

Study of fauna
Mackenzie returned to Melbourne in 1918, taking a house at 612 St Kilda Road converting a part of it into a museum and laboratory; from 1919 this was called the Australian Institute of Anatomical Research. He gave his time more and more to comparative anatomy, and the collecting of Australian faunal specimens. He published in 1918, The Gastro-Intestinal Tract in Monotremes and Marsupials, and The Liver, Spleen, Pancreas Peritoneal Relations and Bileary System in Monotremes and Marsupials; in 1919 with W. J. Owen, The Glandular System in Monotremes and Marsupials, and The Genito-Urinary System in Monotremes and Marsupials. His collection of specimens became very large and valuable, and he refused an American offer of a large sum for it because he preferred to give it to the nation. In 1924 an act was passed establishing the Australasian Institute of Anatomical Research to house the collection at Canberra, and Mackenzie was made the first director with the title of Professor of Comparative Anatomy. He published in this year a short volume on Intellectual Development and the Erect Posture. 

Mackenzie was granted permissive occupancy of around 32 ha (80 acres) of bushland at Badger Creek, Healesville, by the State authorities as a field station for his research in 1920. Before vacating the land in 1927, he had fenced it off, built a house for a curator, a workshop, animal pens and a cottage for visiting scientists. He then recommended that the reserve be increased to around 200 ha (500 acres) and be made a national park. In May 1934, the Sir Colin MacKenzie Sanctuary was officially opened.

Late life
In his later years he did some work in anthropology which was less successful than his anatomical work. He had badly over-worked himself, he had severe blood pressure, and his mind was losing its powers. There was progressive deterioration, and in October 1937 Mackenzie was obliged to give up his position. He returned to Melbourne and died there on 29 June 1938. He was president of the zoological section of the Australian and New Zealand Association for the Advancement of Science in 1928, was a fellow of the Royal Society of Edinburgh, and was knighted in 1929. He married in 1928, Dr Winifred Smith, who survived him. There were no children. He founded the Anne Mackenzie Annual Oration at the Institute of Anatomy, Canberra, in memory of his mother, formerly Anne MacKay. 

Mackenzie had two brothers who were well-known Australian rules footballers, and he retained his interest in the game throughout his life. In his latest book he suggested that the Australian game was an important element in the health of the community. He was, however, chiefly interested in the relief of human suffering, and the furtherance of science. His work in connection with the after-treatment of cases of infantile paralysis was of remarkable value, as was also his study of the anatomy of the Australian fauna. His monument is his great collection of specimens housed at Canberra, which has since had many valuable additions made to it.

References

External links
 

1877 births
1938 deaths
Australian paediatricians
Australian zoologists
Australian people of Scottish descent
Fellows of the Royal Society of Edinburgh
People educated at Scotch College, Melbourne
University of Melbourne alumni